Ocotea kenyensis is a species of plant in the family Lauraceae. It is found in the Democratic Republic of the Congo, Eswatini, Ethiopia, Kenya, Malawi, Mozambique, Rwanda, South Africa, Sudan, Tanzania, Uganda, and Zimbabwe. It is threatened by habitat loss.

References

kenyensis
Flora of East Tropical Africa
Flora of South Tropical Africa
Flora of West-Central Tropical Africa
Flora of Kenya
Trees of Africa
Afrotropical realm flora
Vulnerable flora of Africa
Taxonomy articles created by Polbot